ABK may refer to:

Another name for rapper Anybody Killa
Kabri Dar Airport, Kabri Dar (Kabre Dare), Ethiopia (IATA airport code)
Abkhaz language (ISO 639-3 code)
Activision Blizzard (Activision Blizzard King), American games studio
 ABK Workers Alliance, organized workers at Activision Blizzard King
Ambac Financial Group (former stock symbol)
Ahrends, Burton and Koralek architects
Åtvidabergs BK (ÅBK), a Swedish bandy club